Rajesh Dani (born 19 November 1961) is an Indian former cricketer. He played eleven first-class matches for Bengal between 1979 and 1987.

See also
 List of Bengal cricketers

References

External links
 

1961 births
Living people
Indian cricketers
Bengal cricketers
Cricketers from Kolkata